Israel Singer (born 29 July 1942 in New York City) was secretary general of the World Jewish Congress (WJC) from 1986 to 2007.

Life
Singer grew up in Brooklyn, the son of Austrian refugees. He teaches political science in Touro University, New York, Lander College for Men, and taught at the Bar-Ilan University in Israel.

Singer has been an activist and advocate on behalf of the victims of the Holocaust. As chairman of the World Jewish Restitution Organization (WJRO), he managed efforts to compensate Holocaust survivors monetarily. He also negotiated with Germany and Austria about annuities and compensation for survivors.

In October 2001, he was appointed chairman of the Governing Board of the World Jewish Congress (WJC). In 2002, he was elected president of the Conference on Jewish Material Claims against Germany, the "Claims Conference". In June 2002, he was appointed chairman of the International Jewish Committee for Interreligious Consultations (IJCIC). On January 11, 2005, Singer was forced to resign his post as Secretary General of the WJC at its Plenary Meeting in Brussels. A replacement was elected and Singer was given a position with no financial responsibilities as Chair of the WJC Policy Committee.

Israel Singer is a co-founder of Yahad-In Unum, an organization founded by priest Patrick Desbois, and dedicated to research on the "Holocaust by bullets".

Singer also acted as vice-chairman of the Yad Vashem Council.

Controversies

WJC scandal and resignation
On 14 March 2007 Singer was forced to resign from the WJC as a result of alleged misappropriation of financial resources. The Assurance of Discontinuance from the New York Attorney General describes in detail much of Singer's actions that lead to his termination.

On 17 August 2007, lawsuits were filed by both Bronfman and the WJC in the Supreme Court of New York County; Bronfman's suit claimed "that Singer did not pay back more than $500,000 in personal loans stemming from a 2004 investigation by the New York State Attorney General into the WJC's finances." As a result of that investigation, Singer was required to pay back more than $300,000 to the organization. The WJC suit claimed that Singer "never returned WJC property such as computers, televisions, cellular phones and BlackBerries, that amount to $19,500."

Books

Notes

External links

Yad Vashem Interview

1942 births
Living people
20th-century American Jews
American activists
American political scientists
21st-century American Jews